is a railway station on the Aizu Railway Aizu Line in the town of Shimogō, Minamiaizu District, Fukushima Prefecture, Japan, operated by the Aizu Railway..

Lines

Station layout
Furusato-Kōen Station has one side platform serving a single bi-directional track. The station is unattended.

Adjacent stations

History
Furusato-Kōen Station opened on August 29, 2002.

Surrounding area
 Okawa Furusato-Kōen

See also
 List of railway stations in Japan

External links

 Aizu Railway Station information 

Railway stations in Fukushima Prefecture
Aizu Line
Railway stations in Japan opened in 2002
Shimogō, Fukushima